The 2020–21 season is Ittihad Riadi Tanger's 38th season in existence and the club's 22st in the top flight of Moroccan football, and sixth consecutive.

Kit
Supplier: Gloria Sport / Club Sponsor: front: Tanger-Med , back: Experience Majorel / League Sponsor: sleeves: Inwi.

Season review

October
On 16 October, Ittihad Tanger completed the transfer of 25-year-old gabonais forward Axel Méyé from Chabab Rif Al Hoceima on a three-year contract.

On 29 October, Ittihad Tanger announced the signing of Hakim Aklidou from Chabab Rif Al Hoceima on a three-year contract.

November
On 4 November, Ittihad Tanger reached an agreement with Wydad AC for the transfer of Sofian El Moudane for 2.5 million dirhams In addition to the player Anas El Asbahi contract.

On 5 November, the club announced that Driss El Mrabet would be the new head coach until 30 June 2023.

On 12 November, Ittihad Tanger announced the signing of Mohammed Ali Bemammer from AS FAR for two years.

On 30 November, Ittihad Tanger announced the signing of the former midfielder Kahled Saroukh from OC Khouribga on a three-year contract.

Squad

Transfers

In

Out

Loans Out

Released

Technical staff

Pre-season and friendlies

Competitions

Overview

Botola

Standings

Results summary

Results by round

Matches

Results overview

Throne Cup

Statistics

Squad appearances and goals
Last updated on 27 July 2021.

|-
! colspan=14 style=background:#dcdcdc; text-align:center|Goalkeepers

|-
! colspan=14 style=background:#dcdcdc; text-align:center|Defenders

|-
! colspan=14 style=background:#dcdcdc; text-align:center|Midfielders

|-
! colspan=14 style=background:#dcdcdc; text-align:center|Forwards

|-
! colspan=14 style=background:#dcdcdc; text-align:center| Players who have made an appearance or had a squad number this season but have left the club
|-

|-
|}

Goalscorers

Assists

Hat-tricks

(H) – Home ; (A) – Away

Clean sheets
Last updated on 27 July 2021.

Disciplinary record

Injury record

See also
2015–16 IR Tanger season
2016–17 IR Tanger season 
2017–18 IR Tanger season
2018–19 IR Tanger season
2019–20 IR Tanger season

References

External links

Ittihad Tanger
Moroccan football clubs 2020–21 season